The Origin is a series of comics set in the Buffy the Vampire Slayer universe.  It retells the events of the movie by adapting, and remaining faithful to, Joss Whedon's original script. According to the Official Buffy Watcher's Guide, Whedon wrote the TV pilot episode of Buffy as a sequel to his original movie script, so this adaptation was a chance for fans to see something closer to his intended vision.

Story description

General synopsis

Buffy Summers considers herself a normal high school student until a stranger approaches her and explains her destiny. Buffy only gradually accepts her new role as Vampire Slayer and must prevent the vampire Lothos from taking over Los Angeles.

The Origin #1

Buffy's a popular high school student who's planning her next big school dance. Merrick, a Watcher approaches her and announces that she has become the one and only Vampire Slayer.

The Origin #2

Buffy Summers learns how to fight vampires, but her normal life is falling apart. Meanwhile, the evil vampire Lothos is gathering together a large group of undead Americans hoping to spread evil across the city. The rebel, Pike becomes entangled in Buffy's destiny.

The Origin #3

Buffy's father, Watcher, Merrick, is no more. Buffy has to deal with the evil of Lothos with only Pike to help her. Buffy must somehow negotiate the school dance and a growing evil. In the end, the school gym is burned down (a major variation from the original film, in which the gym still stands at the story's end, but in agreement with the TV series, in which Buffy is notorious for having burned it down and is cited as the reason for her moving to Sunnydale).

Canon status
Whedon stated: "The origin comic, though I have issues with it, CAN pretty much be accepted as canonical. They did a cool job of combining the movie script (the SCRIPT) with the series, that was nice, and using the series Merrick and not a certain OTHER thespian [referring to Donald Sutherland] who shall remain hated."

References

Origin, The